David F. Matuszak is a self-published author, longboard skier, retired teacher and coach. He is best known for authoring The Cowboy's Trail Guide to Westerns and Nelson Point: Portrait of a Northern Gold Rush Town. His most recent book, San Onofre: Memories of a Legendary Surfing Beach focuses on the surfing culture and history of San Onofre, California.

During his tenure at Yucaipa High School, Matuszak developed the Kinesiology and Physical Education department into one of California's model programs. In 1991, he was named California's co-physical educator of the year.   
He retired from Yucaipa in 2015.

Bibliography
San Onofre: Memories of a Legendary Surfing Beach
The Cowboy's Trail Guide to Westerns
Nelson Point: Portrait of a Northern Gold Rush Town  
The Elementary Teacher's Guide to the Gold Rush 
The Physical Educator's Guide to Portfolios

References

External links

American non-fiction writers
American environmentalists
Activists from California
American historians of education
Publishers from California
Writers from California
Western (genre) writers
People from Yucaipa, California
Sportspeople from San Bernardino County, California
California State University, Long Beach alumni
Living people
Year of birth missing (living people)
Historians from California